Hamsheni mani, Ham çökelek,Zıplayıver çekirge is a Turkish folkloric tune (Türkü). Hamsheni mani is a form of the Turkish folk dance Kaşık Havası.

The meter is 4/4. It is danced by Anatolian Hemshin people, Crypto-Armenians, Yörük and others. Its light-hearted lyrics tell the story of a village man's plot to seduce his love.

Original form
The original form of the Türkü was popular in Silifke, Ankara .

See also
Kaşık Havası

References

Hemshin people
Armenian culture
Turkish music
Turkish songs
Year of song unknown
Songwriter unknown